The Latsis Foundation (French: Fondation Latsis internationale) is a charitable foundation, founded in 1975 by the Greek shipping magnate John Latsis.

Amongst other prizes and symposia, it funds the University Latsis Prizes (awarded by the University of Geneva, the University of St. Gallen, the École polytechnique fédérale de Lausanne and the ETH Zurich), the Swiss Latsis Prize (awarded by the Swiss National Science Foundation) and the European Latsis Prize (awarded by the European Science Foundation) until 2012.

It has endowed the Lakatos Award. The foundation is based in Geneva.

Notes and references

See also 
 Prizes named after people
 Louis-Jeantet Prize for Medicine
 Marcel Benoist Prize

External links 
 Official website
 Symposium Latsis EPFL page at École Polytechnique Fédérale de Lausanne website

Organizations established in 1975
Foundations based in Switzerland
Organisations based in Geneva